This is a list of moths of the family Sphingidae that are found in India. It also acts as an index to the species articles and forms part of the full List of moths of India. The list is under development.

Subfamily Sphinginae

Genus Agrius
 Agrius convolvuli Linnaeus 1758

Genus Megacorma
 Megacorma obliqua Rothschild & Jordan 1903

Genus Acherontia
 Acherontia lachesis Fabricius 1798
 Acherontia styx Westwood 1848

Genus Meganoton
 Meganoton analis C. Felder & R. Felder
 Meganoton nyctiphanes Walker 1856
 Meganoton rubescens Butler 1875

Genus Psilogramma
 Psilogramma increta Walker 1865
 Psilogramma menephron Cramer 1780

Genus Apocalypsis
 Apocalypsis velox Butler 1876

Genus Pseudodolbina
 Pseudodolbina fo Walker 1856
 Pseudodolbina aequalis Rothschild & Jordan 1903

Genus Thamnoecha
 Thamnoecha uniformis Butler 1875

Genus Pentateucha
 Pentateucha curiosa Swinhoe 1908

Genus Dolbina
 Dolbina grisea Hampson 1893
 Dolbina inexacta Walker 1856

Subfamily Smerinthinae

Genus Amplypterus
 Amplypterus panopus Cramer 1779
 Amplypterus mansoni Clark 1924

Genus Ambulyx
 Ambulyx sericeipennis Butler 1875
 Ambulyx placida Moore 1888
 Ambulyx semiplacida Inoue 1990
 Ambulyx maculifera Walker 1866
 Ambulyx lahora Butler 1875
 Ambulyx ochracea Butler 1885
 Ambulyx matti Jordan 1923
 Ambulyx belli Jordan 1923
 Ambulyx liturata Butler 1875
 Ambulyx substrigilis Westwood 1848
 Ambulyx canescens Walker 1864
 Ambulyx moorei Moore 1858
 Ambulyx auripennis Moore 1879
 Ambulyx lestradei Cadiou 1998
 Ambulyx sinjaevi Brechlin, 1998
 Ambulyx tobii Inoue 1996

Genus Clanis
 Clanis bilineata Walker 1866
 Clanis undulosa Moore 1879
 Clanis deucalion Walker 1856
 Clanis phalaris Cramer 1777
 Clanis titan Rothschild & Jordan 1903

Genus Leucophlebia
 Leucophlebia lineata Westwood 1847
 Leucophlebia emittens Walker 1866
 Leucophlebia rosacea Butler 1875

Genus Polyptychus
 Polyptychus trilineatus Moore 1888
 Polyptychus dentatus Cramer 1777

Genus Marumba
 Marumba harutai Eitschberger & Ihle 2012
 Marumba cristata Butler 1875
 Marumba spectabilis Butler 1875
 Marumba dyras Walker 1856
 Marumba sperchius Ménétriés 1857
 Marumba nympha Rothschild & Jordan 1903
 Marumba indicus Walker 1856
 Marumba poliotis Hampson 1907

Genus Morwennius
 Morwennius decoratus Moore 1872

Genus Daphnusa
 Daphnusa sinocontinentalis Brechlin 2009

Genus Langia
 Langia zenzeroides Moore 1872

Genus Rhodoprasina
 Rhodoprasina floralis Butler 1876
 Rhodoprasina callantha Jordan 1929
 Rhodoprasina koerferi Brechlin, 2010

Genus Clanidopsis
 Clanidopsis exusta Butler 1875

Genus Agnosia
 Agnosia orneus Westwood 1847
 Agnosia microta Hampson 1907

Genus Craspedortha
 Craspedortha porphyria Butler 1877

Genus Cypa
 Cypa uniformis Mell 1922
 Cypa decolor Walker 1856
 Cypa enodis Jordan 1931
 Cypa ferruginea Walker, 1865

Genus Cypoides
 Cypoides parachinensis Brechlin 2009

Genus Smerinthulus
 Smerinthulus perversa Rothschild 1895

Genus Degmaptera
 Degmaptera mirabilis Rothschild 1894

Genus Callambulyx
 Callambulyx rubricosa Walker 1856
 Callambulyx junonia Butler 1881
 Callambulyx poecilus Rothschild 1898

Genus Anambulyx
 Anambulyx elwesi Druce 1882

Genus Smerinthus
 Smerinthus kindermannii Lederer 1852

Genus Phyllosphingia
 Phyllosphingia dissimilis Bremer 1861

Genus Sataspes
 Sataspes infernalis Westwood 1848
 Sataspes xylocoparis Butler 1875
 Sataspes tagalica Boisduval 1875
 Sataspes scotti Jordan 1926

Subfamily Macroglossinae

Genus Hemaris
 Hemaris rubra Hampson 1893
 Hemaris ducalis Staudinger 1887
 Hemaris fuciformis Linnaeus 1758
 Hemaris saundersii Walker 1856

Genus Cephonodes
 Cephonodes hylas Linnaeus 1771
 Cephonodes picus Cramer 1777

Genus Gnathothlibus
 Gnathothlibus erotus Cramer 1777

Genus Daphnis
 Daphnis nerii Linnaeus 1758
 Daphnis hypothous Cramer 1780
 Daphnis layardii Moore 1882
 Daphnis placida Walker 1856
 Daphnis minima Butler 1977

Genus Dahira
 Dahira rubiginosa Moore 1888
 Dahira obliquifascia Hampson 1910
 Dahira yunnanfuana Clark 1925
 Dahira marisae Schnitzler & Stüning 2009
 Dahira tridens Oberthür 1904

Genus Ampelophaga
 Ampelophaga rubiginosa Bremer & Grey 1852
 Ampelophaga khasiana Rothschild 1895
 Ampelophaga thomasi  Cadiou & Kitching 1998
 Ampelophaga dolichoides Felder 1874

Genus Elibia
 Elibia dolichus Westwood 1847

Genus Acosmerycoides
 Acosmerycoides harterti Rothschild 1895

Genus Acosmeryx
 Acosmeryx anceus Stoll 1781
 Acosmeryx naga Moore 1857
 Acosmeryx sericeus Walker 1856
 Acosmeryx omissa Rothschild & Jordan 1903
 Acosmeryx shervillii Boisduval 1875
 Acosmeryx pseudonaga Butler 1881

Genus Eupanacra
 Eupanacra busiris Walker 1856
 Eupanacra automedon Walker 1856
 Eupanacra regularis Butler 1875
 Eupanacra variolosa Walker 1856
 Eupanacra sinuata Rothschild & Jordan 1903
 Eupanacra metallica Butler 1875
 Eupanacra perfecta Butler 1875
 Eupanacra mydon Walker 1856
 Eupanacra malayana Rothschild & Jordan 1903

Genus Angonyx
 Angonyx testacea Walker 1856
 Angonyx krishna Eitschberger & Haxaire, 2006

Genus Enpinanga 
 Enpinanga assamensis Walker 1856
 Enpinanga borneensis Butler 1879

Genus Cizara
 Cizara sculpta C. Felder & R. Felder 1874

Genus Nephele
 Nephele hespera Fabricius 1775

Genus Neogurelca
 Neogurelca masuriensis Butler 1875
 Neogurelca hyas Walker 1856
 Neogurelca himachala Kirby 1892
 Neogurelca montana Jordan 1915

Genus Sphingonaepiopsis
 Sphingonaepiopsis pumilio Boisduval 1875

Genus Eurypteryx
 Eurypteryx bhaga Moore 1865

Genus Hayesiana
 Hayesiana triopus Westwood 1847

Genus Macroglossum 

 Macroglossum affictitia Butler, 1875 (= M. vialis Butler, 1875 sensu Hampson, 1892)
 Macroglossum aquila Boisduval, 1875 (= M. interrupta Butler, 1875 sensu Hampson, 1892)
 Macroglossum assimilis Swainson, 1821 (= M. belia Hampson, [1893]; bengalensis Boisduval, [1875]; gilia Herrich-Schäffer, [1854] sensu Hampson, 1892)
 Macroglossum avicula Boisduval, [1875] note: Kitching & Cadiou (2000) note this species is probably not Indian, as it is found in Borneo, Java, Sumatra and the Philippines
 Macroglossum belis (Linnaeus, 1758)
 Macroglossum bombylans Boisduval, [1875] (= M. walkeri Butler, 1875 sensu Hampson, 1892)
 Macroglossum corythus Walker, 1856 (= M. proxima Butler, 1875 sensu Hampson, 1892)
 Macroglossum faro (Cramer, 1780)
 Macroglossum fervens Butler, 1875
 Macroglossum glaucoptera Butler, 1875 (= M. lepcha Butler, 1876 sensu Hampson, 1892)
 Macroglossum gyrans Walker, 1856
 Macroglossum heliophila Boisduval, 1875 (= M. divergens Walker, 1856 sensu Hampson, 1892; this is the Sri Lankan subspecies of M. heliophila (see Kitching & Cadiou, 2000))
 Macroglossum hemichroma Butler, 1875
 Macroglossum insipida Butler 1875
 Macroglossum mitchellii Boisduval, [1875]
 Macroglossum mitchellii imperator Butler, 1875 (= M. imperator Butler, 1875 sensu Hampson, 1892)
 Macroglossum passalus (Drury, 1773) (= M. rectifascia R. Felder, [1874] sensu Hampson, 1892)
 Macroglossum regulus Boisduval, 1875 (= M. fervens Butler, 1875 sensu Hampson, 1892)
 Macroglossum semifasciata Hampson, 1892 [1893]
 Macroglossum sitiene Walker, 1856
 Macroglossum stellatarum (Linnaeus, 1758) (hummingbird hawk-moth)

Genus Hyles
 Hyles nervosa Rothschild & Jordan 1903
 Hyles gallii  Rottemburg 1775
 Hyles nicaea De Prunner 1798
 Hyles hippophaes Esper 1789
 Hyles livornica Esper 1780

Genus Deilephila
 Deilephila elpenor Linnaeus 1758
 Deilephila rivularis Boisduval 1875

Genus Hippotion
 Hippotion velox Fabricius 1793
 Hippotion celerio Linnaeus 1758
 Hippotion echeclus Boisduval 1875
 Hippotion rafflesii Butler 1877
 Hippotion rosetta Swinhoe 1892
 Hippotion boerhaviae Fabricius 1775

Genus Theretra
 Theretra nessus Drury 1773
 Theretra boisduvali Bugnion 1839
 Theretra sumatrensis Joicey & Kaye 1917
 Theretra clotho Drury 1773
 Theretra gnoma Fabricius 1775
 Theretra latreillii  W.S. MacLeay 1827
 Theretra alecto Linnaeus 1758
 Theretra mansoni Clark 1924
 Theretra suffusa Walker 1856
 Theretra lycetus Cramer 1775
 Theretra oldenlandiae Fabricius 1775
 Theretra silhetensis Walker 1856
 Theretra griseomarginata Hampson 1898
 Theretra insignis Butler 1882
 Theretra pallicosta Walker 1856
 Theretra castanea Moore 1872

Genus Pergesa
 Pergesa acteus Cramer 1777

Genus Rhagastis
 Rhagastis velata Walker 1866
 Rhagastis acuta Walker 1856
 Rhagastis castor Walker 1856
 Rhagastis confusa Rothschild & Jordan 1903
 Rhagastis lunata Rothschild 1900
 Rhagastis olivacea Moore 1857
 Rhagastis albomarginatus Rothschild 1894
 Rhagastis gloriosa Butler 1875

Genus Cechenena
 Cechenena mirabilis Butler 1875
 Cechenena aegrota Butler 1875
 Cechenena helops Walker 1856
 Cechenena minor Butler 1875
 Cechenena lineosa Walker 1856
 Cechenena scotti Rothschild 1920

See also
Sphingidae
Moths
Lepidoptera
List of moths of India

References
 Cotes, E. C.; Swinhoe, C. (1887) A Catalogue of the Moths of India. Part 1-Sphinges. Indian Museum, Calcutta.
 Hampson, G. F. et al. (1892–1937) The Fauna of British India, Including Ceylon and Burma: Moths. Vols. 1-5 cxix + 2813 p - 1295 figs - 1 table - 15 pl (12 in col.)
 Kitching, I.J. & Cadiou, J-M. (2000) Hawkmoths of the World: an Annotated and Illustrated Revisionary Checklist. Cornell University Press. viii + 227 pp., 8 plates.

External links

Beck, Jan; Kitching, Ian J. The Sphingidae of Southeast-Asia. Version 1.6.
"Hawk moths (Sphingidae)" Thaibugs. Archived June 30, 2007.

 
x
M